Erik Sandvärn (born 4 September 1975) is a Swedish footballer who plays as a central defender for the  Ålandic club IFK Mariehamn in the Finnish Premier Division (Veikkausliiga).

Sandvärn is from Umeå and has got several caps for the official Sami national team.

Erik has played three seasons in IFK Mariehamn, one season in Ykkönen and two in Veikkausliiga. He has become one of the favourite players among the supporters of the club. He is also the first player in IFK Mariehamn to have scored a goal in Veikkausliiga. He joined IFK Mariehamn from Alta IF in Norway.

References

External links
 
  
 
 

Swedish footballers
Swedish Sámi people
Swedish Sámi sportspeople
Alta IF players
IFK Mariehamn players
Veikkausliiga players
Swedish expatriate footballers
Expatriate footballers in Finland
Expatriate footballers in Norway
1975 births
Living people
Association football defenders
Sportspeople from Umeå